2003 ACC tournament may refer to:

 2003 ACC men's basketball tournament
 2003 ACC women's basketball tournament
 2003 ACC men's soccer tournament
 2003 ACC women's soccer tournament
 2003 Atlantic Coast Conference baseball tournament
 2003 Atlantic Coast Conference softball tournament